Collegedale is a city in Hamilton County, Tennessee, United States. The population was 11,109 at the 2020 census. Collegedale is a suburb of Chattanooga and is part of the Chattanooga, TN–GA Metropolitan Statistical Area. Collegedale is home to Southern Adventist University. The median household income is one of the highest in Hamilton County. It has been ranked as one of the best and safest places to live in Tennessee. The unincorporated community of Ooltewah is an enclave in Collegedale.

History
Collegedale was founded as the site of Southern Adventist University (then Southern Junior College) in 1916. It was incorporated under a city manager government in 1968. J.M. Ackerman was the first city manager, and Fred Fuller served as the city's first mayor.

Geography
Collegedale is located in southeastern Hamilton County at  (35.051578, -85.047004), in the valley of Wolftever Creek. Just west of the city center, the creek cuts through White Oak Mountain, forming Collegedale Gap. Tennessee State Route 317 passes through the city center and Collegedale Gap, leading southeast  to State Route 60 and northwest  to Interstate 75 in the northeastern outskirts of Chattanooga. Tennessee State Route 321 runs through the western part of Collegedale, leading north to U.S. routes 11 and 64 just north of Ooltewah and south  to the Georgia state line.

Demographics

2020 census

As of the 2020 United States census, there were 11,109 people, 4,167 households, and 2,485 families residing in the city.

2000 census
As of the census of 2000, there were 6,514 people, 2,049 households, and 1,528 families residing in the city. The population density was 781.6 people per square mile (301.9/km2). There were 2,199 housing units at an average density of 263.9 per square mile (101.9/km2). The racial makeup of the city was 90.55% White, 4.37% African American, 0.01% Native American, 0.01% Asian, 0.03% Pacific Islander, 2.87% from other races, and 2.16% from two or more races. Hispanic or Latino of any race were 7.74% of the population.

There were 2,049 households, out of which 33.3% had children under the age of 18 living with them, 61.0% were married couples living together, 10.7% had a female householder with no husband present, and 25.4% were non-families. 20.5% of all households were made up of individuals, and 7.0% had someone living alone who was 65 years of age or older. The average household size was 2.57 and the average family size was 2.96.

In the city the population was spread out, with 19.8% under the age of 18, 25.2% from 18 to 24, 25.4% from 25 to 44, 16.7% from 45 to 64, and 13.0% who were 65 years of age or older. The median age was 29 years. For every 100 females there were 88.5 males. For every 100 females age 18 and over, there were 85.6 males.

The median income for a household in the city was $42,270, and the median income for a family was $52,337. Males had a median income of $37,819 versus $28,345 for females. The per capita income for the city was $18,604.  About 5.3% of families and 7.4% of the population were below the poverty line, including 10.5% of those under the age of 18 and 4.0% of those 65 and older.

Collegedale has a large Seventh-day Adventist community and in 2005 was described as an "enclave" for the religion by Charles Reagan Wilson and Mark Silk.

Economy
McKee Foods is headquartered in Collegedale. Originally launched in Chattanooga in 1934,  the company moved to a facility on the campus of Southern Adventist University in 1956. McKee Foods is the producer of Little Debbie and Sunbelt snack foods.

Arts and culture
In August 2011, the city took over control of the Collegedale Public Library, which was previously operated under the Hamilton County library system. Library membership is available on a paid subscription basis, free to residents of Collegedale.

Parks and recreation
Six parks are managed by the Parks & Recreation Department of Collegedale:
East Hamilton County Park has a high school baseball field and three youth fields.
Wolftever Creek Greenway is a greenway which spans throughout the city and continues to be expanded upon by the city.
Collegedale Dog Park provides dog-owners with a dog park for unleashed dog socialization.
Imagination Station & Pavilion is a playground and rental space located behind City Hall with a train theme.
The Nature Nook is an amphitheatre built by the East Hamilton County Kiwanis Club for the city.
Veterans Memorial Park is located along the Wolftever Creek Greenway and features plaques, sculptures and flags as a memorial to United States war veterans.

The town has youth and adult softball leagues.  It also has four pickleball courts adjacent to the Imagination Station and City Hall.

Government
Collegedale was incorporated in 1968. It operates under a City Manager-Commission form of government. Five commissioners are elected by popular vote and they are responsible for choosing a city manager, who then proceeds to implement the commissions policies.

On 5 August 2013, Collegedale became the first city in Tennessee to extend health benefits to same-sex couples.

Education
Southern Adventist University, a private Christian university, is located in Collegedale. It has an affiliated K-12 education system, Collegedale Academy, which includes Collegedale Academy Middle School, and Collegedale Academy Elementary

Wolftever Creek Elementary School and Ooltewah Middle School are the two public schools inside of city limits. Both schools belong to the Hamilton County Schools system.

Infrastructure

Transportation

The city is located just off the I-75 corridor. Collegedale Municipal Airport is owned by the city of Collegedale and has about 120 aircraft stationed there. In 2003, the airport was awarded the Tennessee Aeronautics Commission's "Airport of the Year" title.

Utilities
Collegedale has a recycling program which requires the public to bring their recyclables to the city public works department. The city uses recycling to reduce the costs of landfill waste disposal and offsets the cost of recycling by selling the recyclable materials. Comcast provides cable services and CenturyLink supplies landline phone services. Electricity is supplied by EPB and the Chattanooga Gas Company supplies gas needs. The city and/or Hamilton County handles resident sewer needs and Eastside Utility District handles water services.

Health & safety
The city utilizes Hamilton County Emergency Medical Services for emergency medical services and contracts fire & rescue services to the Tri-Community Volunteer Fire Department located in Collegedale. The local volunteer fire department, at Station 1, has 100 members and support staff and an ISO Class 2 rating. The Collegedale Police Department provides police services for the city.

References

External links
 City of Collegedale official website

Populated places established in 1916
Cities in Hamilton County, Tennessee
1916 establishments in Tennessee